Sitabhog is a famous sweet of Bardhaman, West Bengal, India. Sitabhog is a flavourful dessert that looks like white rice or vermicelli mixed with small pieces of Gulab jamun. Made from cottage cheese (also known as chhana in Bengali), rice flour and sugar, Sitabhog often gives the appearance of pulao, which is albeit sweet in taste.

History

According to Late Nagendranath Nag, his grandfather Late Khettranath Nag first invented special Sitabhog and Mihidana in Bardhaman during the regime of Maharaja Late Mahatabchand Bahadur. Seventy two years after this invention the name of Sitabhog and Mihidana earned its reputation all over India after the arrival of Lord Curzon in Bardhaman and his appraisal for these two sweets.

On invitation of Maharaja Vijaychand Mahatab Lord Curzon visited Bardhaman on 19 August 1904. To memorize the welcome lunch of Lord Curzon, Maharaja ordered Vairabchandra Nag, a  sweet-maker of the town, to prepare something new and unique which would amaze the Lord. Vairabchandra Nag undertook the responsibility and introduced two new preparations named Sitabhog and Mihidana. Lord Curzon was surprised to have such unique sweets and praised and thanked Vairabchandra Nag in the certificate given to him saying he never had such sweet ever before. Thereafter, the quality and name of these two sweets reached all over the country and abroad. Late Nagendranath Nag, son of Late Vairabchandra Nag, broadcast this incident on Radio on 15 November 1976.

Popularity 
Bengali actor, comedian and theater personality, Nabadwip Haldar sang this line-

Geographical Indications 
Sitabhog of Bardhaman achieved the Geographical Indications of West Bengal on 29 April 2017.

See also
Mihidana
Langcha
Mysore pak
Dharwad pedha

References

Sweets of West Bengal
Geographical indications in West Bengal
Indian desserts